The Fleur du Cap Theatre Awards are annual South African theatre awards focusing on professional productions staged in and around Cape Town. Awards are presented in 20 categories.

History
The Fleur du Cap Theatre Awards were originally known as the Three Leaf Arts Awards. The first awards were made in 1965 for the preceding year's productions. The awards were instituted by the United Tobacco Company, who sponsored them until 1977. The Oude Meester Foundation for the Performing Arts, which was formed following the merger of Stellenbosch Farmers' Winery and Distillers Corporation into Distell, then became the sponsor of the awards, renaming them the Fleur du Cap Theatre Awards. Fleur du Cap was originally the name of an old wine farm in Somerset West and a brand name used by Stellenbosch Farmers' Winery. The Oude Meester Foundation for the Arts was later renamed Distell Arts and Culture.

Award ceremonies
The Fleur du Cap Theatre Awards is a red carpet event held annually in March. South African entertainers perform at the event and funds generated are donated to development in the performing arts.
Award winners receive R15,000 and a silver medallion.

References

Further reading
Saunders, Tracey (June 2013). "From the Papagaaiberg to Table Mountain: The Fleur du Cap Theatre Awards," Land n Sand pp. 62–63

External links
Fleur du Cap Theatre Awards website
Distell website

Awards established in 1965
Cape Town culture
Theatre in South Africa
South African theatre awards